Hamilton Place is an antebellum plantation house in Maury County, Tennessee, near Columbia.

The house was completed in 1832. It was built for Lucius Junius Polk, a wealthy cotton planter who served as a state senator and later as Tennessee's adjutant-general, by master builder Nathan Vaught. The Palladian design of its front facade is based on Palladio's design for the Villa Pisani at Montagnana. The interior floor plan was loosely based on the White House floor plan, and an interior arcade is styled after a design by Brunelleschi for a hospital in Florence, Italy.

Hamilton Place was listed on the National Register of Historic Places in 1973. It is across the highway from Rattle and Snap, the house built in 1845 for Lucius J. Polk's brother George Washington Polk.

See also
Ashwood Hall
Rattle and Snap

References

Houses on the National Register of Historic Places in Tennessee
Georgian architecture in Tennessee
Greek Revival houses in Tennessee
Houses completed in 1832
Houses in Columbia, Tennessee
National Register of Historic Places in Maury County, Tennessee